Axminster Carpets Ltd is an Axminster, Devon based English manufacturer of carpets, particularly the same-named Axminster carpets.

Background
Whilst visiting Cheapside Market, London, Devon-based weaver Thomas Whitty was impressed by a large Turkish carpet he saw. On his return to Axminster, he used his skills to work out how to produce a product of similar quality. After several months work he completed his first carpet on midsummer's day 1755.

Whitty's carpets, looking much like horizontal-tapestries, became the benchmark for wealthy aristocrats to have in their country homes and town houses, between 1755 and 1835. The company produced Axminster carpets for: the music room of the Royal Pavilion, Brighton; Chatsworth House; Powderham Castle; Saltram House; and Warwick Castle. King George III and Queen Charlotte of Mecklenburg-Strelitz purchased Axminster carpets and also visited the factory.

In 1800, the company made a  carpet for Mahmud II, the Sultan of the Ottoman Empire, known today as the most famous Axminster Carpet of all. Depicting a blazing sun, moon and a whole constellation of stars, it cost £1000. Carried out of the factory by thirty men from the local Congregational Church, it was initially placed in the Topkapi Palace. It was then moved to the Defterdar Palace, where it became the property of Esma Sultan, the daughter of Sultan Mustapha III.

Decline
In 1828, a disastrous fire destroyed the weaving looms. In 1835 the company owner, Samuel Rampson Whitty, the founder's grandson, was declared bankrupt. Blackmores of Wilton, Wiltshire, near Salisbury, bought the remaining stock and looms and extended their business to include hand-knotted carpets, which were still called Axminsters.

In July 2012, Axminster Heritage Ltd bought the now Grade II listed former original carpet factory in which Thomas Whitty founded the company and wove the first carpets. It now houses the town's heritage centre, incorporating the town museum and the tourist information centre.

Refoundation

In 1929, Kidderminster-resident Scottish-born carpet manufacturer Harry Dutfield founded a new carpet company with his former schoolfriend Stephen Quayle. However, as the depression hit, the company became beset by Union problems. Setting off for the 1935 London Motor Show to buy his first Jaguar car, Dutfield met a vicar on the train from the West Country, who told him that carpets had not been made in the town of Axminster since the 1828 fire.

At the outbreak of World War II, Dutfield converted the factory to produce stirrup pumps and later aircraft parts, while Dutfield himself was an officer in the Home Guard.

After hostilities ceased, and with severe shortages of raw materials, keen fisherman Dutfield bought a woollen mill at Buckfast, near Buckfastleigh, which came with salmon fishing rights on the River Dart. This enabled Dutfield to establish the company on its original basis, being the complete "from fleece to floor" carpet maker.

After handing over day-to-day running of the company to his son Simon, Dutfield semi-retired from the company to pursue his hobby of fishing. Awarded an MBE for his services to British exports, Dutfield died at his home in Axminster on 21 May 1999.

Present

Today, Axminster Carpets is the only manufacturer to purchase, wash, card, spin and dye its own yarn before weaving the carpet itself.

To celebrate 250 years of carpet weaving in Axminster, in 2005 a commemorative rug was produced. Paraded by the company's weavers through the town, it was then blessed by the Bishop of Exeter and presented to the Earl of Devon. The carpet is now in Clarence House, the then home of King Charles III. Also in 2012, Axminster was awarded a Royal Warrant for the supply of goods and services to the Royal Household.

The modern Axminster-type power loom is capable of weaving high quality carpets with many varying colours and patterns, and is manufactured all over the world. Due to their hard-wearing and durable nature, Axminster carpets are most frequently used in country homes, luxury hotels, global airlines and train carriages. Every Wetherspoon pub has a bespoke designed carpet manufactured by Axminster.

On 19 February 2020 it was announced that the company had gone into administration. However it was bought out of administration in March 2020 by a group of investors including the former owners.

References

Further reading

External links
 Company website

Manufacturing companies established in 1755
1755 establishments in Great Britain
British companies disestablished in 1835
Manufacturing companies established in 1937
Companies based in Devon
Textile manufacturers of England
Carpet manufacturing companies
British Royal Warrant holders
British shadow factories
Companies that have entered administration in the United Kingdom
1755 establishments in England
1937 establishments in England
Axminster
British companies established in 1755
British companies established in 1937
1835 disestablishments in England